Aleš Valenta (born 6 February 1973 in Šumperk, Czechoslovakia) is a former Czech freestyle skier who participated in aerials.

On February 19, 2002, he won the Winter Olympics gold medal in the freestyle aerials competition where he succeeded to perform the first triple back flip with five twists in the world. He operates the freestyle skiing centre in the town of Štíty.

External links
  Official Web site
  Official Web site on Ales Valenta Acrobat Park
  Profile  on Czech Olympic Committee's Web site

1973 births
Freestyle skiers at the 1998 Winter Olympics
Freestyle skiers at the 2002 Winter Olympics
Freestyle skiers at the 2006 Winter Olympics
Czech male freestyle skiers
Living people
Olympic gold medalists for the Czech Republic
Olympic freestyle skiers of the Czech Republic
Olympic medalists in freestyle skiing
Medalists at the 2002 Winter Olympics
People from Šumperk
Sportspeople from the Olomouc Region